Jacqueline Jill White (born 22 February 1941) is a former New Zealand Labour Party politician, and a registered nurse.

Early life and career
White was born in Feilding in 1941. She attended Manchester Street Primary School and Feilding Agricultural High School before attending Victoria University of Wellington where she gained a Bachelor of Science and then Canterbury Teachers' College. She later completed a Bachelor of Arts at Massey University.

She first worked as a secondary school teacher in New Zealand from 1965, and later Samoa via Volunteer Service Abroad, before becoming a nurse in 1972. White also worked in the United Kingdom as a nurse before returning to New Zealand in 1979 where she became a community and public nurse before retiring in 1988.

Local body politics
White was a councillor on Palmerston North City Council from 1983 to 1992. This was followed by some years in Parliament, a role from which she resigned in 1998 to become Mayor of Palmerston North. She held that post until 2001. She was the first woman to hold the position. In 1989, she was elected a member of the Manawatu-Wanganui Regional Council, remaining a member until 1994 when she resigned. She was later a Horizons Regional Councillor from 2007 until 2013.

White's community involvement was with the Girl Guides, District Committee for the Prevention of Child Abuse and the National Council of Women.

Member of Parliament

From 1993 to 1998, she was a member of Parliament for the Labour Party, first as MP for Manawatu and then as a list MP. In 1996, she had stood in Rangitīkei unsuccessfully.

Notes

References

Works cited

Ministers and Members in the New Zealand Parliament by G.A. Wood (University of Otago Press, 2nd edition 1996)  

|-

1941 births
Living people
Mayors of Palmerston North
New Zealand Labour Party MPs
Members of the New Zealand House of Representatives
Women mayors of places in New Zealand
Palmerston North City Councillors
New Zealand nurses
New Zealand MPs for North Island electorates
New Zealand list MPs
New Zealand women nurses
Women members of the New Zealand House of Representatives